Metheptazine is an opioid analgesic from the phenazepane family. It was developed by American Home Products in the 1950s.

Metheptazine produces similar effects to other opioids, including analgesia, sedation, dizziness and nausea.

Metheptazine is not listed as a controlled substance under the Controlled Substances Act 1970 in the United States.  The Canadian Controlled Drugs and Substances Act specifically excludes the phenazepine opioids from control.

References 

Synthetic opioids
Azepanes
Carboxylate esters
Mu-opioid receptor agonists
Methyl esters